Hoi Pa is an area and village in Tsuen Wan District, Hong Kong.

Administration
Hoi Pa and Hoi Pa New Village are recognized villages under the New Territories Small House Policy.

History
In late 19th Century, it was one of four yeuk in Tsuen Wan, together with Kwai Chung, Shek Wai Kok and Tsing Yi. The heads of four yeuks formed the Tsuen Wan Security Council to secure the area of Tsuen Wan.

See also
 Tai Wo Hau station

References

External links

 Delineation of area of existing village Hoi Pa (Cheung Pei Shan Road) (Tsuen Wan) for election of resident representative (2019 to 2022)
 Delineation of area of existing village Hoi Pa (South Platform) (Tsuen Wan) for election of resident representative (2019 to 2022)
 Delineation of area of existing village Hoi Pa (Wo Yi Hop Road and Kwok Shui Road) for election of resident representative (2019 to 2022)

Villages in Tsuen Wan District, Hong Kong